Alarsite (AlAsO4) is an aluminium  arsenate mineral with its name derived from its composition: aluminium and arsenate. It occurs as brittle subhedral grains which exhibit trigonal symmetry. It has a Mohs hardness of 5-5.5 and a specific gravity of 3.32. It is semitransparent, colorless with pale yellow tints and shows a vitreous luster. It is optically uniaxial (+) with refractive indices of nω = 1.596 and nε = 1.608.

It was reported from fumaroles in the Tolbachik volcano, Kamchatka, Far Eastern Region, Russia. It occurs in association with fedotovite, klyuchevskite, lammerite, nabokoite, atlasovite, langbeinite, hematite and tenorite.

References 

Arsenate minerals
Aluminium minerals
Trigonal minerals
Minerals in space group 152 or 154
Geology of Russia